Tory Creek is a stream in Carroll and Floyd counties, Virginia, in the United States.

Tories who camped along Tory Creek after the Revolutionary War caused the name to be selected.

See also
List of rivers of Virginia

References

Virginia#USA

Rivers of Carroll County, Virginia
Rivers of Floyd County, Virginia
Rivers of Virginia